The Capitulation of Kalix took place during the Finnish War, on 25 March 1809, when 3,800–4,500 Swedish and Finnish troops under Hans Henrik Gripenberg surrendered to a much larger Russian army under Pavel Andreyevich Shuvalov, as part of a large Russian threefold attack against Sweden. The capitulation was characterised by the Swedish High Command as treacherous and Gripenberg was soon court-martialed.

Background 
After the Russian conquest of Finland, the Russian emperor Alexander I of Russia ordered a threefold attack on Sweden, to enforce a quick peace. The operation was launched in the midst of the Swedish revolution, in which the king Gustav IV Adolf was deposed. On 10 March 1809, a large Russian army under Gotthard Johann von Knorring moved against the Swedish forces stationed at Åland, in order to capture and use the islands for a continued offensive against Stockholm. Subsequently, another force of 3,700 men under Michael Andreas Barclay de Tolly went over Kvarken and forced the Swedish commander at Umeå, Major General Johan Adam Cronstedt to retreat, on 22 March. Barclay was, however, ordered to withdraw back to Sweden the next day, as a result of the Åland offensive and the following negotiations. Simultaneously, Pavel Andreyevich Shuvalov with a Russian corps of 9,000 men started moving against the northern Swedish border, at the Torne River, while pushing a Swedish force of 3,000 men under Hans Henrik Gripenberg before him. Gripenberg re-established a defensive position behind the Kalix River, with the intention of fighting a delaying action.

Capitulation and aftermath 
The Russian vanguard made contact with the Swedish rearguard at Sangis, however the fighting ended abruptly and the two sides parleyed. Gripenberg, who found his situation hopeless with the Russians moving on his flank, received a letter from Cronstedt, in which the retreating general overestimated the Russian force to 10,000–11,000 men; for this reason, as he incorrectly believed he would be cut-off from southern Sweden by a large Russian force, and as the Swedes were promised to be dismissed rather than kept as prisoners (on the condition that they withdrew from the war), he capitulated on March 25—in what would be known as the Convention of Säivis. Gripenberg's force was mostly made up of battle-hardened Finns who, as they marched through Tornio, surrendered their weapons at Kemi Church and wandered home, to Finland. The capitulation involved a total of about 7,075 men and all their provisions, a number in which sick and non-combatants are included as well as troops not present at Kalix; as was the case with the Swedish Västerbotten Regiment, of which one battalion refused the capitulation terms and was instead captured at the Battle of Skellefteå. 

At the time, the capitulation was deemed as an act of treachery—comparable to Carl Olof Cronstedt's surrender at Sveaborg—however, under the prevailing circumstances and with the information granted to him, the court-martialed Gripenberg was not solely to blame. The Russian threefold attack had nevertheless failed to achieve a quick desirable peace, for which reason Knorring lost his supreme command to Barclay. The war, which meant the end of Sweden–Finland as a country, would continue until 17 September 1809.

Units included in the convention 
Nyland Dragoon Regiment: three squadrons surrendered.
Karelian Dragoon Corps: none surrendered (not present at Kalix)
Åbo Infantry Regiment: three battalions surrendered.
Nyland Infantry Regiment: one battalion surrendered.
Björneborg Infantry Regiment: three battalions surrendered.
Österbotten Infantry Regiment: one battalion and one company surrendered.
Tavastehus Infantry Regiment: two battalions and three companies surrendered.
Nyland Jäger Battalion: three companies surrendered.
Västerbotten Infantry Regiment: one out of the two battalions surrendered (not present at Kalix).
Finnish and Swedish land and sea artillery: 10 guns
Savolax Artillery Regiment
Archipelago fleet

Notes, citations and sources

Notes

Citations

Sources

Kalix 1809
Kalix
1809 in Sweden
Kalix 1809
Kalix 1809
Kalix 1809
March 1809 events